Reverse tolerance or drug sensitization is a pharmacological phenomenon describing subjects' increased reaction (positive or negative) to a drug following its repeated use. Not all drugs are subject to reverse tolerance.

This is the opposite of drug tolerance, in which the effect or the subject's reaction decreases following its repeated use. The two notions are not incompatible, and tolerance may sometimes lead to reverse tolerance. For example, heavy drinkers initially develop tolerance to alcohol, requiring them to drink larger amounts to achieve a similar effect, but as excessive drinking can cause liver damage, this can then put this group at risk of intoxication when drinking even very small amounts of alcohol.  Sensitization, a form of reverse tolerance, develops rapidly to the positive, euphoric effects of alcohol, but not to the physical effects, such as sedation and respiratory depression, which diminish with prolonged use.  This sensitization does not occur, however, with administration of benzodiazepines or neuroactive steroids, which only exhibit weakening of effect with repeated use.

Reverse tolerance can also occur in users of stimulants such as cocaine or amphetamines. A previously recreational dose may become enough to cause psychosis in regular users, or users who previously had a psychotic episode may be more likely to have one in the future and at lower doses once drug usage continues.

In some cases drug sensitization may also refer to medical interventions (e.g. a drug holiday) that aim to reduce the insensitivity caused by drug tolerance.

See also
Desensitization (medicine)
Downregulation and upregulation
Kindling (sedative–hypnotic withdrawal)

References 

Substance dependence